The Graduate School of Design is located on the main campus of Ewha Womans University, in Seoul, South Korea.

External links 
 Ewha Womans University (Official website)
 Graduate School of Design at Ewha Womans University (Official website)

Graduate School of Design